The Henry Dinwoodey House, at 411 East 100 South, Salt Lake City, Utah, is a Late Victorian house that was designed by Richard Kletting, architect of the Utah State Capitol.  It was built in 1890 and was listed on the National Register of Historic Places in 1974. The house exhibits characteristics of both Queen Anne Style architecture, with its assymmetrical facade and corner turret, and Romanesque Revival style, including rough-hewn stone, squat columns, and foliated carvings.

It was built as a home for Sara Kinersley, the third polygamous wife of Henry Dinwoodey, a Mormon.  It is historically significant mostly for its connection to Henry Dinwoodey, owner of a very successful furniture business in Utah and the broader Intermountain region.  Dinwoodey was jailed as a polygamist in the 1880s.

References

External links
Dinwoodey Mansion, with multiple photos. 
Dinwoodey Cabinet and Chair Shop, replicated in a heritage village, related to carpenter Henry Dinwoodey

Houses on the National Register of Historic Places in Utah
Victorian architecture in Utah
Houses completed in 1890
Houses in Salt Lake City
1890 establishments in Utah Territory
National Register of Historic Places in Salt Lake City